Fatehganj may refer to:

Places
 Fatehganj, a town in Faizabad district, Uttar Pradesh, India
 Fatehganj, Unnao, a village in Unnao district, Uttar Pradesh, India
 Fatehgunj, a place in Vadodara district, Gujarat, India

See also 
 Fatehganj Pashchimi
 Fatehganj Purvi